Aevex Aerospace  is an American defense industry firm specializing in airborne intelligence gathering solutions headquartered in Solana Beach, California.  The company designs aircraft, integrates sensors and payloads and provides flight test support services.  According to CNN reporter Barbara Starr, Aevex "does work for US special operations, specifically for covert special operations units."  The company was founded in 2017, employs 500 people and is a combination of three established defense contractors: Merlin Global Services, CSG Solutions and Special Operations Solutions.  Aevex has offices in California, North Carolina and Virginia with a training range in Roswell, New Mexico.

On April 21, 2022 it was announced that Aevex had produced 121  Phoenix Ghost one-way unmanned aerial vehicles which will be sent to Ukraine.

References

Science and technology in California
Defense companies of the United States